The .55 Boys (13.9×99mmB in metric) is an anti-tank cartridge used by the United Kingdom in World War II. It was designed for use with the Boys Anti-Tank Rifle.

Design
The .55 Boys is a 13.2×99mm Hotchkiss cartridge necked up to accept a .55 caliber bullet in mid-1930s. Since the shoulder of the case was narrowed, a belt was added to ensure reliably correct headspace. It performed poorly when compared to contemporary foreign anti-tank rounds, such as the German 7.92×94mm Patronen and the Soviet 14.5×114mm rounds and, as a result, it was quickly deemed obsolete.

History

The concept of a small arm round for use against tanks began with the German 13.2mm TuF round, designed during World War I for use against the first British tanks.

In the 1930s, the United Kingdom began designing an anti-tank rifle to counter enemy armoured vehicles in the event of a war.

Initially the gun design was trialled using .50 inch bullet with a belted case due to lack of armour-piercing performance the calibre was increased  to .55 

Development on what is known as the .55 Boys was started by Captain Henry C. Boys, the Assistant Superintendent of Design at the Royal Small Arms Factory, Enfield in 1934. Boys died before the rifle was officially adopted and it was named after him. The .55 Boys round was a modified .50 BMG round necked up to accept a larger, steel-cored bullet in order to increase its armour penetration. A belt was added to reinforce the case with the heavy propellant charge.

The .55 Boys was adopted and manufactured alongside the Boys Anti-Tank Rifle in 1937 throughout the Commonwealth of Nations by firms such as Kynoch. When the United Kingdom entered World War II, the .55 Boys round was soon found to be insufficient against even early war Axis tanks in late 1939 and 1940. However, the United Kingdom had to rely on the .55 Boys round because no better infantry anti-tank weapons were available. When the PIAT anti-tank weapon was introduced in 1943, the shaped charge it fired was far more effective against enemy armour than the .55 Boys round. The Boys rifle was phased out of service on the frontline as the PIAT became the British military's primary handheld anti-tank weapon. 

Although not effective as an anti-tank weapon, the .55 Boys was used until the end of World War II by British and Commonwealth countries. It also saw use during the Winter War and Continuation War by Finland. 
The Boys was issued to Home Guard units in the UK for use against "light armoured fighting vehicles...which the Home Guard are likely to have to deal with, certainly in the early stages of either an air-borne or sea-borne landing on our coasts." A handbook for its use noted that as well as the expected penetration of armour at various distances and angles that it would penetrate 14 inches of brick wall and 10 inches of sandbags.

By the conclusion of World War II, the .55 Boys was no longer used in any major capacity.

Variants
The .55 Boys round went through two major variants in its lifetime, along with an experimental variant that was never adopted by the United Kingdom.

Mark I
This is the first variant of the .55 Boys. A ball and tracer version of this round was also created along with a practice round using an aluminum core in order to be more feasible for training.

Mark II
An improved loading named the Mark II was released in order to increase the round's velocity and its penetration. It generates a muzzle velocity of approximately 884 m/s (2,899.5 ft/s).

APCR tungsten round
An experimental armour-piercing composite rigid (APCR) .55 Boys round was designed in 1942. It used a tungsten core instead of a steel core, which greatly increased its penetrating ability and gave a boost to its muzzle velocity from the Mark II's 884 m/s to approximately 944 m/s (3100 ft/s). It differs from the Mark I and II rounds because of its two-part bullet. This model was never officially adopted because far better anti-tank rounds and weapons, such as the PIAT, were entering service at the time. The .55 Boys, even with a greatly improved bullet, was simply too weak to defeat the tanks being fielded by the Wehrmacht. It was however effective against the more lightly armoured tanks of the Imperial Japanese Army in the Asian and Pacific theaters up until the end of the war.

See also
 13mm caliber
 14.5×114mm
 12.7×108mm
 List of rifle cartridges

Notes

Pistol and rifle cartridges
Military cartridges
British firearm cartridges
13.9x99mmB